Kathleen Gemberling Adkison (July 5, 1917 – August 3, 2010) was an American abstract painter.

Early life
Kathleen Gemberling Adkison was born in Beatrice, Nebraska, to parents Rupert Parks and Henrietta Williamson. She attended Hawthorn High School in Kearney, Nebraska for three years, and graduated from Garfield High School in Seattle, Washington. She studied art and painting under Leon Derbyshire at the Cornish Institute between 1938 and 1942.

Career

Adkison was the last surviving artist trained under Mark Tobey, who was Jackson Pollock's inspiration.  She was considered one of the Northwest's premier female artists.

Her work has been shown in museums as early as 1960 when the Frye Art Museum staged a solo show of her work. She also had a show at the Northwest Museum of Arts and Culture, formerly the Cheney Cowles Memorial Museum, in Spokane, Washington, from December 13, 1973 to January 13, 1974.

Like Jackson Pollock, Adkison worked with her canvas on the floor. She is recognized as among the first women to do so. However, her focus was based on the natural beauty of rocks, trees, tall grasses, and other images she perceived from her hikes with her husband.

Adkison was a critically acclaimed artist and highly recognized for her work. She was among only eight women included in Northwest Art Today at the 1962 Seattle World's Fair.

Adkison was the feature of a solo retrospective at the Cheney Cowles Museum in Spokane, Washington, from March 27, 1999, to June 27, 1999. It was the first retrospective of her work, at that museum, since 1974.

Personal life
Adkison married Thomas Adkison, an architect, in 1968. They had three children. Adkison enjoyed hiking, and she climbed to the base camp at Mt. Everest twice. She died on August 3, 2010, in Spokane, Washington.

References 

1917 births
2010 deaths
20th-century American painters
20th-century American women artists
Abstract expressionist artists
American women painters
People from Beatrice, Nebraska
21st-century American women